Kalna Assembly constituency is an assembly constituency in Purba Bardhaman district in the Indian state of West Bengal. It is reserved for scheduled castes.

Overview
As per orders of the Delimitation Commission, No. 264 Kalna (SC) assembly constituency covers Kalna municipality, Kalna II community development block and Bagnapara, Hatkalna and Krishnadevpur gram panchayats of Kalna I community development block.

Kalna (SC) assembly segment was part of Katwa (Lok Sabha constituency) prior to 2009. As per orders of Delimitation Commission it is part of No. 38 Bardhaman Purba (Lok Sabha constituency) from 2009.

Members of Legislative Assembly

Election results

2021

2016

2011

 

.# Swing calculated on Congress+Trinamool Congress vote percentages taken together in 2006.

1977–2006
Anjali Mondal of CPI(M) won the Kalna assembly seat in 2006, defeating her nearest rival Asis Chakraborty of Trinamool Congress. Contests in most years were multi cornered but only winners and runners are being mentioned. Anju Kar of CPI(M) won the seat 2001, 1996, 1991, 1987 and 1982 defeating her nearest  rivals, Sridhar Banerjee of Trinamool Congress in 2001, Lakshman Kumar Roy of Congress in 1996, Dhirendranath Chaterjee of Congress in 1991 and 1987, and Sudhir Ghosh of Congress in 1982. Guruprasad Sinha Roy of CPI(M) won the seat in 1977 defeating Debendra Bejoy Ghosh of Janata Party in 1977.

1951–1972
Nurul Islam Molla of Congress won the Kalna assembly seat in 1972. Hare Krishna Konar of CPI(M) won the seat in 1971, 1969, 1967  and 1962 (representing CPI). In 1957 and 1951, it was a double member seat. In 1957, it was won by Hare Krishna Konar and Jamadar Majhi, both representing CPI. In independent India's first election in 1951, it was won by Baidyanath Santal and Rasbehari, both Congress.

References

Politics of Paschim Bardhaman district
Assembly constituencies of West Bengal
Politics of Purba Bardhaman district